Abhay Daanam is a Charitable bird and animal hospital that has been working since 2016. They have a team of veterinary doctors and other staff, and provide free ambulance and medicines services.

Background 
The founders, trustees, and volunteers of Abhay Daanam follow the beliefs of Jainism, such as compassion to all living beings.  They opened their first bird rescue centre in Indirapuram, Ghaziabad U.P Bharat. Later they started rescuing large animals by opening their second shelter in Village Sunpura, Noida extension (U.P), Bharat.

Now they have established their shelters in three parts of Bharat and one outside Bharat
 Indirapuram, Ghaziabad (U.P)
 Village Sunpura, Greater Noida (U.P)
 Tirthankar Leni, Shahada (Maharashtra)
 Kotugoda, Colombo, (Sri Lanka)

Currently they have two ambulances.

Demonstration 
Abhay Daanam initiated a demonstration at Jantar Mantar, New Delhi by the name "Manja Kills", about the pain and suffering of birds caused by flying kites on the events like Makar Sankranti, and Independence Day.

See also 
 Animal welfare and rights in India

References 

Veterinary hospitals
Veterinary medicine in India